The Raigam Tele'es Best Upcoming Teledrama Actor Award is a Raigam Tele'es award presented annually in Sri Lanka by the Kingdom of Raigam companies for the best upcoming Sri Lankan actor of the year in television screen.

The award was first given in 2005.

Award list in each year

References

Upcoming Actor
Awards for male actors